Michael II Kourkouas (Oxeites) (Greek: Μιχαήλ Β΄ Κουρκούας), (? – after 1146) was an Eastern Orthodox patriarch of Constantinople (July 1143 – March 1146).

In early 1143, Patriarch Leo and Emperor John II Komnenos died within a few months of each other, bringing a period of turbulence to the Byzantine Church. John's appointed successor, his son Manuel I Komnenos arrived in Constantinople on 27 June 1143, from Cilicia where his father had died. In order to fully assure his position as emperor, Manuel needed to arrange his coronation. However, to do this he first needed to appoint a patriarch. His choice fell on the abbot of the monastery of Oxeia, Michael Kourkouas. The coronation did not take place until 28 November 1143, because Michael threatened to resign for unknown reasons.

During his reign, Michael had to deal with the highly political trial of a monk called Niphon. On 22 February 1144, Michael condemned Niphon for supporting two Cappadocian bishops who were accused of heresy and later found guilty of Bogomil practices. This forbade orthodox believers from associating with him.
Michael II resigned in March 1146 to return to the monastery of Oxeia, most likely because of disillusion with the emperor.

References

12th-century patriarchs of Constantinople
Kourkouas family
Byzantine people of Armenian descent
Officials of Manuel I Komnenos